The year 2022 is the 13th year in the history of the Road Fighting Championship, a mma promotion based in South Korea. 2022 starts with ARC 7.

List of events

ARC 7 

AfreecaTV ROAD Championship ARC 7  was a mixed martial arts event scheduled to be held by Road FC on January 18, 2022, at the Lotte World Afreeca Colosseum, Lotte World Tower in Seoul, South Korea.

Background 
An openweight bout between debuting Young Ho Seol and Uchiha Song was scheduled as the event headliner. An openweight bout was scheduled for the event co-feature as well, which saw Dong Hyun Bae face Ho Yeon Jung.

A 63kg catchweight bout between Ji Hoon Son and Kil Soo Lee was scheduled as the featured fight of the evening.

Results

Road FC 60

ROAD FC 60  will be a mixed martial arts event scheduled to be held by Road FC on April 30, 2022, at the Lotte World Afreeca Colosseum, Daegu Gymnasium in Daegu, South Korea.

Background
A ROAD FC Featherweight title bout between the reigning champion Hae Jin Park and title challenger Soo Chul Kim was booked as the event headliner.

A ROAD FC Bantamweight title bout for the vacant title between Ik Hwan Jang and Je Hoon Moon was scheduled as the co-main event.

A special three-round boxing exhibition bout between A Sol Kwon and Young Ho Seol was booked for the event.

Fight Card

Road FC 61

Road FC 61  was a mixed martial arts event scheduled to be held by Road FC on July 23, 2022, at the Wonju Gymnasium in Wonju, South Korea.

Background
A Road FC Lightweight Championship bout for the vacant title between Si Won Park and Seung Mo Park was booked as the event headliner. A flyweight bout between Jung Hyun Lee and Taiki Akiba served as the co-main event.

Fight card

ARC 8

ARC 8  was a mixed martial arts event scheduled to be held by Road FC on November 13, 2022, at the Lotte World Afreeca Colosseum in Seoul, South Korea.

Background
The event was headlined by a 139 lbs catchweight bout between Sergei Choi and Kil Soo Lee.

Fight card

ROAD FC 62

ROAD FC 62  was a mixed martial arts event scheduled to be held by Road FC on December 18, 2022, at the Swiss Grand Hotel in Seoul, South Korea.

Background
A ROAD FC lightweigtht championship bout between champion Si Won Park and title challenger Je Woo Yeo headlined the event, while a 161 lbs catchweight bout between A Sol Kwon and Koji Nakamura served as the co-main event.

Fight card

See also 

 List of Road FC events
 List of Road FC champions
 List of current Road FC fighters
 List of current mixed martial arts champions
 2022 in UFC
 2022 in Bellator MMA
 2022 in ONE Championship
 2022 in Absolute Championship Akhmat
 2022 in Konfrontacja Sztuk Walki
 2022 in Rizin Fighting Federation
 2022 in AMC Fight Nights 
 2022 in Brave Combat Federation
 2022 Professional Fighters League season
 2022 in Eagle Fighting Championship
 2022 in Legacy Fighting Alliance

References 

Road Fighting Championship events
Road FC
Road FC
Road FC